Commissioner of Crown Lands may refer to:

Commissioners of Crown Lands (UK)
Commissioner of Crown Lands (Australia)
Minister for Lands (Western Australia)
Commissioners of Crown Lands (Province of Canada)
Commissioners of Crown Lands (Ontario)